Sean Frank Kazmar Jr. (born August 5, 1984) is an American former professional baseball infielder. He played in Major League Baseball (MLB) for the San Diego Padres and Atlanta Braves.

Amateur career
Kazmar attended the College of Southern Nevada. In 2003, he played collegiate summer baseball with the Wareham Gatemen of the Cape Cod Baseball League.

Professional career
Kazmar was drafted by the Oakland Athletics in the 37th round of the 2003 Major League Baseball Draft, but did not sign.

San Diego Padres
The San Diego Padres drafted Kazmar out of the College of Southern Nevada in the fifth round of the 2004 Major League Baseball Draft and he signed. Kazmar started  with the Double-A San Antonio Missions and was batting .264 in 111 games when he was called up to the majors on August 12, 2008. He recorded his first Major League hit on August 13, 2008, on the first pitch of his first ever plate appearance from the Milwaukee Brewers' pitcher CC Sabathia. On November 6, 2010, he elected free agency.

Seattle Mariners
On November 17, 2010, Kazmar signed a minor-league deal with the Seattle Mariners. He spent the year with the Tacoma Rainiers and elected free agency on November 2, 2011.

New York Mets
On January 10, 2012 Kazmar signed with the New York Mets to a minor-league deal. He elected free agency on November 2, 2012, after spending the year with the Binghamton Mets and Buffalo Bisons.

Atlanta Braves
On January 19, 2013, Kazmar signed a minor-league deal with the Atlanta Braves. Since 2013, he has played for the Gwinnett Braves/Stripers minor league baseball team. He elected for free agency after the 2014 season. On November 12, 2014, Kazmar resigned with the Braves organization. He elected for free agency on November 7, 2015. On December 13, Kazmar resigned a minor-league contract. He elected for free agency on November 7, 2016. On November 19, he signed a new minor-league contract to remain with the Braves organization. On November 6, 2017, Kazmar elected free agency. Kazmar was resigned to a minor-league deal on November 16, 2017. Kazmar was invited to Spring Training for the 2019 season but did not make the team. He was again invited to Spring Training for the 2020 season. He became a free agent on November 2, 2020. On December 7, 2020, Kazmar again re-signed with the Braves on a minor-league contract. He received an invitation to attend Major League Spring Training on February 15, 2021.

On April 17, 2021, Kazmar was selected to the 40-man roster and promoted to the major leagues for the first time since 2008. That same day he made his first MLB appearance in over 12 years, pinch hitting for Huascar Ynoa, he grounded into a double play in his only at-bat. At a time span of 12 years and 206 days, this is the ninth longest gap for a player between major league appearances in MLB history. On April 24, 2021, he was optioned to the Braves alternate site. After receiving only 2 plate appearances in 3 games, Kazmar was outrighted off of the 40-man roster on May 10, 2021. The Braves would go on to win the World Series, earning Kazmar his first World Series victory.

Kazmar elected free agency on October 14. Kazmar retired from professional baseball on November 12, 2021.

References

External links

1984 births
Living people
Atlanta Braves players
Baseball players from Georgia (U.S. state)
Binghamton Mets players
Buffalo Bisons (minor league) players
Eugene Emeralds players
Fort Wayne Wizards players
Gwinnett Braves players
Gwinnett Stripers players
Lake Elsinore Storm players
Major League Baseball shortstops
Peoria Saguaros players
Portland Beavers players
San Antonio Missions players
San Diego Padres players
Southern Nevada Coyotes baseball players
Tacoma Rainiers players
Wareham Gatemen players
West Oahu Canefires players
People from Valdosta, Georgia
St. Cloud River Bats players